Hans Hendrik van Paesschen (c. 1510-1582) was a Flemish architect, based in Antwerp, who designed high-style classical buildings in many countries of northern Europe.

Life and Times
While Italy was blessed with the architecture of Andrea Palladio and France with that of Philibert Delorme, a contemporary of theirs, Hans Hendrik van Paesschen, was designing equally beautiful buildings in northern Europe. One of the reasons he is so little known is that in each country where he worked his name was spelled differently.

After presumably receiving his training in Italy, Paesschen established himself in Antwerp as architect and builder, often using the sculptor Cornelis Floris de Vriendt to secure architectural commissions for him. Paesschen worked in Flanders, the Netherlands, England, Wales, north Germany, Denmark, Norway, Sweden, and Königsberg. It is also likely that he designed buildings in northeastern France, Estonia, Latvia and Lithuania, but these have so far not been identified.

In sharp contrast to the gothic and mannerist styles being used at the time in northern Europe, Paesschen often designed buildings in a pure Florentine style, but with a northern flavor. He employed arcaded and colonnaded loggias, domes, and Venetian arches on his best buildings.  The majority of his buildings have been destroyed or substantially altered, so his work is known mostly through old pictures. Several generations of his descendants in the Van de Passe family were notable engravers, usually with the surname de Pas or van de Passe.

Major works attributed to Paesschen
 1549ff: Triumphal gates, Antwerp and elsewhere
 1559ff: Fortifications, Antwerp
1559: Fortifications, Alvsborg, Norway
c.1559: Villa with dome, London
c.1560: Queen's Loggia, Windsor
c.1560: Duke of Brabant's Palace, Brussels
c.1560: Steelyard, London
1561: Raadhuis, Antwerp
1561: Gresham House, London
1564: Hanseatenhuis, Antwerp
1564: Parts of Burghley House, England
1564: Loggia, Copthall, England
1564: Fortifications, Willemstad, the Netherlands
1565: Reformed Church, Willemstad
1565: Fortifications, Klundert, the Netherlands
c.1565: Temple Bar I, London
1566: Fortifications, Bohus, Sweden
1566: Cathedral altarpiece, Lund, Sweden
1566: Royal Exchange, London
1567: Fortifications, Akershus, Norway
1567: Osterley House, England
1567: Bachegraig House, Wales
1567: Faringdon Town Hall, England
1567: Part of Theobalds, England
1568: Town Plan, Frederikstad, Norway
1568: Part of Gorhambury, England
1570: Part of Rathaus, Lubeck, Germany
1571: Selsø Castle, Denmark
1574: Part of Kronborg Castle, Denmark
1574: Part of University, Copenhagen
1576: Uraniborg, Denmark
1577: Bathhouse, Hillerod, Denmark
1577: Fadeburslangen, Hillerod
1578: Vallo Castle, Denmark
1579: 76 Stengade, Helsingor, Denmark

References

1510s births
1582 deaths
Architects from Antwerp
Renaissance architects
Architects of the Habsburg Netherlands
Belgian expatriates in Denmark
Belgian expatriates in England
Belgian expatriates in Norway
Belgian expatriates in Sweden